A list of films produced in the Soviet Union in 1946 (see 1946 in film).

1946

See also
1946 in the Soviet Union

References

External links
 Soviet films of 1946 at the Internet Movie Database

1946
Soviet
Films